Ola Håkansson is a Swedish singer, composer and producer. He is the founder and CEO of TEN Music Group, a Swedish independent record label. He also founded Stockholm Records, another record label and a subsidiary of UMG. In 2012 Ola started 100 SONGS, a record label focused on releasing singles.

Ola Håkansson was born in Stockholm. He was the singer of the band Ola and the Janglers and later Secret Service. In 1986 he recorded the duets "The Way You Are" and "Fly Like The Eagle" with Agnetha Fältskog.

He was part of the songwriting trio Norell Oson Bard.  In 1992, with Alexander Bard, Håkansson
founded the independent record company Stockholm Records.

He has four sons, Andreas, Viktor, David and Ludvig, and a daughter, Linnéa Håkansson.

Filmography 
Ola & Julia (1967) by Jan Halldoff

References

External links 

Swedish male singers
Swedish composers
Swedish male composers
English-language singers from Sweden
1945 births
Living people
musicians from Stockholm